Olearia paucidentata, the autumn scrub daisy, is a species of flowering plant in the family Asteraceae and is endemic to the south-west of Western Australia. It is a shrub with variably-shaped leaves, and white, mauve or blue and mauve or yellow, daisy-like inflorescences.

Description
Some leaves have up to four lobes on the edges.

Taxonomy
This daisy was first formally described in 1845 by Joachim Steetz who gave it the name Eurybia paucidentata in Johann Georg Christian Lehmann's Plantae Preissianae. In 1867 George Bentham changed the name to Olearia paucidentata in Flora Australiensis. The specific epithet (paucidentata) means "few-toothed", referring to the leaves.

Distribution and habitat
Autumn scrub daisy is widespread and common in the south-west of Western Australia, where it grows in open forest, often in damp places like river banks and swamps.

References

External links
Olearia paucidentata images & occurrence data from Atlas of Living Australia
iNaturalist:Olearia paucidentata images

Taxa named by Joachim Steetz
Plants described in 1845
Flora of Western Australia
paucidentata